Chloroclystis parthenia is a moth in the family Geometridae. It is found in South America.

References

External links

Moths described in 1994
parthenia